The 2004 Atlantic hurricane season was a very deadly, destructive, and extremely active Atlantic hurricane season, with over 3,200 deaths and more than $61 billion (2004 USD, $95.77 billion 2022 USD) in damage. More than half of the 16 tropical cyclones brushed or struck the United States. Due to the development of a Modoki El Niño – a rare type of El Niño in which unfavorable conditions are produced over the eastern Pacific instead of the Atlantic basin due to warmer sea surface temperatures farther west along the equatorial Pacific – activity was above average. The season officially began on June 1 and ended on November 30, though the season's last storm, Otto, dissipated on December 3, extending the season beyond its traditional boundaries. The first storm, Alex, developed offshore of the Southeastern United States on July 31, one of the latest dates on record to see the formation of the first system in an Atlantic hurricane season. It brushed the Carolinas and the Mid-Atlantic, causing one death and $7.5 million (2004 USD) in damage. Several storms caused only minor damage, including tropical storms Bonnie, Earl, Hermine, and Matthew. In addition, hurricanes Danielle, Karl, and Lisa, Tropical Depression Ten, Subtropical Storm Nicole and Tropical Storm Otto had no effect on land while tropical cyclones. The season was the first to exceed 200 units in accumulated cyclone energy (ACE) since 1995, mostly from Hurricane Ivan, the storm produced the highest ACE. Ivan generated the second-highest ACE in the Atlantic, only behind 1899 San Ciriaco Hurricane.

There are four notable storms: Hurricane Charley, that made landfall in Florida as a Category 4 hurricane on the Saffir–Simpson hurricane wind scale (SSHWS), causing $16 billion in damage in the United States alone. Later in August, Hurricane Frances struck the Bahamas and Florida, causing at least 49 deaths and $10.1 billion in damage. The costliest and most intense storm was Hurricane Ivan. It was a Category 5 hurricane that devastated multiple countries adjacent to the Caribbean, before entering the Gulf of Mexico and causing catastrophic damage on the Gulf Coast of the United States, especially in the states of Alabama and Florida. Throughout the countries it passed through, Ivan caused 129 fatalities and over $26.1 billion in damage. The deadliest storm was Hurricane Jeanne, which caused torrential rainfall in the mountainous areas of Haiti, resulting in mudslides and severe flooding that caused at least 3,000 fatalities. Jeanne also struck Florida, inflicting extensive destruction. Overall, the storm caused at least $7.94 billion in damage and 3,042 deaths, ranking it as one of the deadliest Atlantic hurricanes in history.

Collectively, the storms of this season caused at least 3,261 deaths and about $61.15 billion in damage, making it the costliest Atlantic hurricane season at the time, until surpassed by the following year. As of 2022, it ranks as the fifth costliest Atlantic hurricane season to date. With six hurricanes reaching at least Category 3 intensity, 2004 also had the most major hurricanes since 1996. However, that record would also be surpassed by 2005 and 2020, with seven major hurricanes in those years. In the spring of 2005, four names were retired: Charley, Frances, Ivan, and Jeanne. This tied the then-record most names retired with 1955 and 1995, a mark also surpassed in 2005, when five were retired.

Seasonal forecasts 

Since 1984, forecasts of hurricane activity have been issued before each hurricane season by noted hurricane expert Dr. William M. Gray and his associates at Colorado State University (CSU), and separately by forecasters with the U.S. Government's National Oceanic and Atmospheric Administration (NOAA). According to CSU, the average season between 1950 and 2000 had 9.6 tropical storms, 5.9 hurricanes, and 2.3 major hurricanes, which are Category 3 or higher on the Saffir-Simpson hurricane wind scale. A normal season, as defined by NOAA, has 12.1 named storms, of which 6.4 reach hurricane strength and 2.7 become major hurricanes.

CSU released its first prediction on December 5, 2003, which projected an above average season, with 13 named storms, seven hurricanes, and three major hurricanes. This forecast was adjusted upward slightly on April 2. On May 17, prior to the start of the season, NOAA forecasters predicted a 50% probability of activity above the normal range, with twelve to fifteen tropical storms, six to eight of those becoming hurricanes, and two to four those hurricanes reaching major intensity. Dr. Gray released a prediction on May 28 that was similar, with 14 named storms, eight reaching hurricane strength, and three becoming major hurricanes.

After the season began, Dr. Gray announced he had revised his predictions slightly downwards on August 6, citing mild El Niño conditions. His new forecast was thirteen named storms, seven hurricanes, and three reaching major hurricane intensity. On August 10, NOAA released an updated prediction as well, with a 90% probability of above-to-near normal activity, but the same number of storms forecast. CSU issued another forecast on September 3, indicating sixteen tropical storms, eight hurricanes, and five major hurricanes. The season ended up with sixteen tropical depressions, fifteen named storms, nine hurricanes, and six major hurricanes, which matched CSU's final prediction on October 1.

Seasonal summary

The Atlantic hurricane season officially began on June 1, 2004. However, the first system, Hurricane Alex, did not develop until July 31. It was an above average season in which 16 tropical cyclones formed. All but one tropical depression attained tropical storm status, and nine of these became hurricanes. Six hurricanes further intensified into major hurricanes. Due to a Modoki El Niño – a rare type of El Niño in which unfavorable conditions are produced over the eastern Pacific instead of the Atlantic basin due to warmer sea surface temperatures farther west along the equatorial Pacific – activity was above average. Five hurricanes and three tropical storms made landfall during the season and caused 3,270 deaths and about $60.9 billion in damage. Additionally, Hurricane Alex and Tropical Storm Earl also caused losses and fatalities, though neither made landfall. The season officially ended on November 30, 2004.

Tropical cyclogenesis began at the end of July, with the development of Hurricane Alex on July 31. However, it did not become a named storm until the following day, which was the fifth-latest start since the 1952 season. August was an unusually active month, with eight named storms, including Alex, Bonnie, Charley, Danielle, Earl, Frances, Gaston, and Hermine. This broke the record for the most named storms in the month of August set in 1933 and 1995. This new record was tied in 2012. On average, there are only three tropical storms and one to two hurricanes in August. Of the eight systems that month, five became hurricanes and three strengthened further into major hurricanes. A total of five tropical cyclones developed in September, including the most intense system of the season, Hurricane Ivan. Activity decreased further in October, with the formation of only two systems, Tropical Storm Matthew and Subtropical Storm Nicole. The season then went dormant for over a month and a half, until Tropical Storm Otto developed on November 29. Otto was the final tropical cyclone of the season and degenerated into a remnant low pressure on December 3.

Reflecting the season's high activity, the accumulated cyclone energy (ACE) index for the 2004 Atlantic hurricane season as calculated by Colorado State University using data from the National Hurricane Center was 226.9 units, one of the highest values on record in the basin. ACE is, broadly speaking, a measure of the power of the hurricane multiplied by the length of time it existed, so storms that last a long time, as well as particularly strong hurricanes, have high ACEs. It is only calculated for full advisories on tropical systems at or exceeding , which is tropical storm strength.

The 2004 season was very deadly, with about 3,270 fatalities overall. Nearly all of the deaths were reported in Haiti following the floods and mudslides caused by Tropical Storm Jeanne. The other tropical cyclones that caused fatalities include Hurricane Alex, Charley, Frances, Gaston, and Ivan, and Tropical Storms Bonnie and Earl. Because four out of the six major hurricanes made several landfalls, the season was also extremely damaging, with losses estimated at $60.9 billion, over half of which was caused by Hurricanes Charley and Ivan. A few other tropical cyclones caused light to moderate damage, including Hurricanes Alex and Gaston and Tropical Storms Bonnie and Matthew. In addition to the 16 tropical cyclones of the season, a tropical low in May brought torrential flooding to Haiti and the Dominican Republic, killing 2,000 people and causing extensive damage. Although the system was not officially classified as a tropical storm, it did have a circulation with loosely organized convection, resembling a subtropical cyclone.

Records
The 2004 season had numerous unusual occurrences and set many records. However, most of them were surpassed by the following year. With six hurricanes reaching at least Category 3 intensity, 2004 also had the most major hurricanes since 1996, a record which would be surpassed in 2005. Florida was directly impacted by four major hurricanes during the season – Hurricane Charley, Frances, Ivan, and Jeanne. This was the first time four tropical cyclones produced hurricane-force winds in one state during a single season since four hurricanes made landfall in Texas in 1886. There were many other hurricanes in the season that were individually unusual. Hurricane Alex was the strongest hurricane on record to intensify north of 38°N latitude. Hurricane Ivan was the most unusual storm of the season. Ivan became the southernmost Category 4 hurricane on record in the Atlantic basin, as well as the first major hurricane in the Atlantic on record to form as low as 10°N latitude. Additionally, hurricanes Charley and Ivan ranked as the third and second costliest hurricanes in the United States at the time, respectively, behind only Hurricane Andrew. With $60.9 billion in damage, this was the costliest season at the time, until the following year.

Systems

Hurricane Alex

After initially being poorly organized, the depression strengthened into Tropical Storm Alex late on August 1. The storm tracked northeastward and became a hurricane on August 3. Alex reached major hurricane status second farthest north in the Atlantic, after Hurricane Ellen in 1973. Eventually, Alex weakened due to cooler sea surface temperatures. The hurricane fell to tropical storm intensity around 12:00 UTC on August 6.

A man drowned near Nags Head due to these conditions. As a result, 10,000 buildings and houses were left without electricity. The combination of strong winds and the storm surge damaged more than 100 buildings and houses. At Ocracoke, coastal flooding was considered the worst since Hurricane Gloria in 1985. Damage in North Carolina reached about $7.5 million. In Rehoboth Beach, Delaware, three people were injured by rip currents, while five others were hospitalized in New Jersey.

Tropical Storm Bonnie

The depression crossed the Lesser Antilles on August 4, before degenerating back into a tropical wave. The remnants traversed the Caribbean Sea, and re-developed into Tropical Depression Two on August 8. The depression strengthened further upon reaching the Gulf of Mexico and was upgraded to Tropical Storm Bonnie on August 9. A break in a mid-level ridge re-curved Bonnie northward on August 10 and then northeastward on August 11. The storm rapidly weakened inland and degenerated as a remnant low offshore of New Jersey on August 14.

In the Lesser Antilles, the storm brought light winds and mostly localized flooding to Saint Vincent and the Grenadines. The regenerated system brought light rainfall to the Yucatán Peninsula. In North Florida, scattered power outages were reported, and rainfall and storm surge flooded roads, especially in Taylor County. A tornado in Jacksonville damaged several businesses and homes. Tornadoes were also reported in The Carolinas, and Virginia, with one in North Carolina destroying 17 homes and impacting 59 others. It also caused three deaths and $1.27 million in damage. Minor flooding also occurred in Mid-Atlantic and New England. In Atlantic Canada, basement and road flooding was reported, especially in Edmundston, New Brunswick. Slick roads caused one death in that area.

Hurricane Charley

A tropical wave developed into Tropical Depression Three on August 9 to the south-southeast of Barbados. Early on August 10, it was upgraded to Tropical Storm Charley, before reaching hurricane intensity south of Jamaica on August 11. Charley continued to strengthen after curving northwestward and was a  Category 3 hurricane when it made landfall near Alquízar, Cuba on August 13. After emerging into the Straits of Florida, Charley weakened to a Category 2 hurricane. At 19:45 UTC on August 13, Charley made landfall at Cayo Costa, Florida, followed by another landfall in Punta Gorda about an hour later. Charley rapidly weakened over Florida, falling to Category 1 by early on August 14. Later that day, the storm emerged into the Atlantic, before making two more landfalls in Cape Romain and Myrtle Beach, South Carolina as a minimal hurricane. Late on August 14, Charley weakened to a tropical storm over southeastern North Carolina, shortly before becoming extratropical near Virginia Beach, Virginia.

The storm brought rainfall and strong winds to the island of Jamaica. In Westmoreland Parish, flooding inundated several homes and damaged roadways. Winds in the parish caused a large tree to fall on a house, resulting in significant damage to the home. In Kingston, high winds damaged power lines and homes. Widespread power outages occurred due to numerous downed trees and power lines. The storm left $4.1 million in damage and one fatality in Jamaica. At least 70,290 homes and about 3,000 agricultural buildings were either damaged or destroyed. Roughly 95% of sugar cane, bean, and banana crops were ruined. There were four deaths and $923 million in damage. Impact in Florida was extreme: strong winds caused 2 million power outages and destroyed more than 2,439 structures and impacted over 26,749 others. Charley caused 24 deaths and 792 injuries. Agricultural losses were heavy, especially to oranges. Damage to agriculture totaled about $2.2 billion. In South Carolina, 2,231 houses were damaged, with 2,317 of those severely damaged and 40 were destroyed. Approximately 141,000 people were left without electricity. Port Charlotte was left without electricity for 13 days. Charley destroyed 40 houses and damaged 2,231 other homes in the state. Throughout the United States, the storm caused $16 billion in damage, with nearly of all of it in Florida. The remnants of Charley produced light rainfall in Nova Scotia and Newfoundland.

Hurricane Danielle

A tropical wave developed into Tropical Depression Four while south-southeast of Cape Verde on August 13. Although sea surface temperatures were only marginally warm, the depression strengthened into Tropical Storm Danielle early on August 14. Further intensification occurred and by early on August 15, Danielle reached hurricane status. The storm deepened significantly over the next 24 hours and became a Category 2 hurricane.

At the time of peak intensity on August 16, Danielle was heading northward to north-northwestward because of a subtropical ridge. Shortly thereafter, southwesterly vertical shear began increasing, causing the hurricane to weaken. Mid-level flow associated with a diffluent trough caused Danielle to move northeastward on August 18. Later that day Danielle deteriorated to a Category 1 hurricane, hours before being downgraded to a tropical storm. On August 19, Danielle became nearly stationary and moved erratically while southwest of the Azores. Eventually, the storm curved west-southwestward and weakened to a tropical depression on August 20. About 24 hours later, Danielle degenerated into a remnant low-pressure area.

Tropical Storm Earl

The depression headed westward between  due to a strong subtropical ridge located to its north. After developing banding features and an increase in Dvorak intensity estimates, the depression was upgraded to Tropical Storm Earl at 18:00 UTC on August 14. Later on August 15, Earl crossed the Windward Islands and passed just south of Grenada.

Although Earl appeared well-organized, it unexpectedly degenerated into a tropical wave on August 16, after a reconnaissance aircraft reported no closed circulation. The remnants eventually reached the Pacific Ocean and developed into Hurricane Frank on August 23. Tropical storm force winds and heavy rainfall in Grenada damaged at least 34 homes and a nursing home and toppled several trees and electrical poles. Damage on other islands was confined to a few impacted homes, moderate crop losses, and widespread power outages, especially in Saint Vincent and the Grenadines and Tobago. One fatality occurred and 19 people were listed as missing.

Hurricane Frances

Moving west-northwestward, the depression strengthened into Tropical Storm Frances later that day. Frances reached hurricane status late on August 25 while curving northwestward. Late the following day, Frances weakened to a Category 3 hurricane during an eyewall replacement cycle. Although approaching the Bahamas, wind shear and increasing westerly winds aloft caused Frances to weaken to a Category 3 hurricane late on September 2.

Early the next day, Frances struck Cat Island while somewhat weaker. The system decelerated and weakened slightly to a Category 2 hurricane before landfall in Eleuthera hours later. Moving slowly west-northwestward, the hurricane made landfall in Hutchinson Island, Florida at the same intensity, early on September 5. Rapidly weakening, Frances fell to Category 1 intensity around midday and deteriorated to a tropical storm about six hours later. Early on September 7, Frances weakened to a tropical depression over Georgia. By late the next day, the system became extratropical, though the remnants persisted until dissipation over the Gulf of Saint Lawrence on September 11.

In the Bahamas, about 75% of residents lost electricity. Between 13 and 17 percent of the non-native Australian pine on San Salvador Island experienced damage, primarily from snapping, though some browning from salt spray was noted. Several feet of water flooded the international airport at Freeport. Insured losses reached about $300 million. Severe damage was also dealt to banana, corn, and pineapple crops. About 4,160 homes received minor damage, while 2,522 houses were rendered uninhabitable or destroyed. About 700 people were left homeless. Additionally, sea walls, schools, bridges, roads, and docks were damaged. Strong winds brought severe damage to Florida, especially counties along the east coast. Hundreds of homes, mobile homes, and businesses were destroyed in Indian River, Martin, and St. Lucie counties, and damage was inflicted on thousands of other structures there. In the tri-county area alone, damage totaled approximately $4.5 billion. Palm Beach County also suffered particularly severely, with 15,000 houses and 2,400 businesses damaged there. About 4.27 million customers were left without electricity in Florida. Frances and its remnants brought extensive flooding to other states, especially in Georgia, North Carolina, Ohio, and Pennsylvania. The storm spawned 101 tornadoes in the United States, with 45 in South Carolina alone. Damage in the United States totaled approximately $9.8 billion, placing Frances among the costliest hurricanes in the country. Overall, the storm caused 49 deaths, two each in the Bahamas and Ohio, eight in Georgia, and thirty-seven in Florida.

Hurricane Gaston

The depression gradually strengthened and was upgraded to Tropical Storm Gaston early on August 28. Initially, Gaston tracked slowly, moving southeastward and then westward, before a developing mid- to upper-level ridge re-curved the storm northwestward. Gaston strengthened and briefly became a hurricane at 120:00 UTC on August 29, although operationally it was thought to have peaked as a strong tropical storm. Gaston weakened rapidly inland and was only a tropical depression by early on August 30. Gaston re-strengthened into a tropical storm while located over eastern Virginia on August 31, just hours before emerging into the Atlantic. Gaston re-intensified slightly further, but became extratropical near Sable Island on September 1.

Strong winds destroyed eight homes, damaged more than 3,000 buildings, and left more than 150,000 people without power. Additionally, flash flooding further inland severely damaged or destroyed at least 20 homes in Berkeley County. In North Carolina, widespread street flooding occurred, including inundation of portions of Interstates 40 and 95. Several trees were downed by strong winds, especially in Chatham and Johnston counties. A tornado in Hoke County damaged several homes. In Chesterfield, Dinwiddie, Hanover, Henrico, and Prince George counties, 350 homes and 230 businesses were damaged or destroyed, and many roads were closed due to high water. In Richmond, more than 120 roads were closed, including a portion of Interstate 95. There were nine fatalities. Throughout the United States, Gaston caused about $130 million in damage. The remnants produced light rainfall in Nova Scotia, Newfoundland, and Sable Island.

Tropical Storm Hermine

The frontal zone that spawned Hurricane Gaston developed an area of convection south of Bermuda on August 25. After detaching from the front and developing a circulation, the system became a tropical depression at 18:00 UTC on August 27. It initially remained weak while the convection fluctuated, until intensifying into Tropical Storm Hermine at 12:00 UTC on August 29. Later that day, wind shear exposed the circulation to the north of the convection, though the storm was able to a peak as a  tropical storm on August 30. The storm turned northward under the steering currents of a subtropical ridge. Increased wind shear from Gaston weakened Hermine. By late on August 30, the circulation was entirely exposed from the convection.

Early on August 31, Hermine made landfall near New Bedford, Massachusetts as a minimal tropical storm. It rapidly weakened while moving northward, and after becoming extratropical, Hermine was absorbed by a frontal zone later that day. In Moncton, minor basement flooding and street closures were reported.

Hurricane Ivan

A westward-moving tropical wave developed into a tropical depression on September 2, before becoming Tropical Storm Ivan on the following day. Tracking westward, Ivan gradually strengthened, reaching hurricane intensity on September 5. On September 6, the storm strengthened significantly, becoming a Category 4 hurricane, despite being located at an unusually low latitude. It subsequently weakened, though it reached major hurricane status again the next day. Late on September 7, Ivan passed close to Grenada while heading west-northwestward. Although located near the Netherlands Antilles on September 9, Ivan briefly became a Category 5 hurricane. During the next five days, Ivan fluctuated between a Category 4 and 5 hurricane. The storm passed south of Jamaica on September 11 and then the Cayman Islands on the next day. Although curving northwestward, Ivan brushed western Cuba as a Category 5 hurricane on September 14.

Shortly after moving to the west of Cuba on September 14, Ivan entered the Gulf of Mexico. Over the next two days, the storm gradually weakened while tracking north-northwestward and northward. It quickly weakened inland, falling to tropical storm status later that day and tropical depression strength by early on September 17. The storm curved northeastward and eventually reached the Delmarva Peninsula, where it became extratropical on September 18. The remnants of Ivan moved southward and then southwestward, crossing Florida on September 21 and re-entering the Gulf of Mexico later that day. Late on September 22, the remnants regenerated into Ivan in the central Gulf of Mexico as a tropical depression, shortly before re-strengthening into a tropical storm.
 
Throughout the Lesser Antilles and in Venezuela, Ivan caused 44 deaths and slightly more than $1.15 billion in losses, with nearly all of the damage and fatalities in Grenada. Although Ivan was passing south of Hispaniola, the outer bands of the storm caused four deaths in the Dominican Republic. In Jamaica, high winds and heavy rainfall left $360 million in damage and killed 17 people. The storm brought strong winds to the Cayman Islands, resulting in two deaths and $3.5 billion in damage. In Cuba, a combination of rainfall, storm surge, and winds resulted in $1.2 billion in damage, but no fatalities. Heavy damage was reported along the Gulf Coast of the United States. Along the waterfront of Escambia and Santa Rosa counties in Florida, nearly every structure was impacted. In the former, 10,000 roofs were damaged or destroyed. About 4,600 homes were demolished in the county. Similar impact occurred in Alabama. Property damage was major along Perdido Bay, Big Lagoon, Bayou Grande, Pensacola Bay and Escambia Bay. A number of homes were completely washed away by the high surge. Further inland, thousands of other houses were damaged or destroyed in many counties. Ivan produced a record tornado outbreak, with at least 119 twisters spawned collectively in nine states. Throughout the United States, the hurricane left 54 fatalities and $20.5 billion in damage. Six deaths were also reported in Atlantic Canada.

Tropical Depression Ten

A tropical wave accompanied with a well-organized area of convection emerged off the western coast of Africa on August 29. Performing a slow curve over the eastern Atlantic, the wave became increasingly less-defined over subsequent days as a result of strong southwesterly wind shear. Hostile environmental conditions caused the depression to remain below tropical storm intensity and subsequently degenerate into a remnant low by 12:00 UTC on September 9 after the center decoupled from the remainder of the convective activity. The low-level circulation persisted near the Azores until dissipating the following day.

Hurricane Jeanne

After crossing the island while moving west-northwestward, the depression intensified into Tropical Storm Jeanne around midday on September 14. Hours later, Jeanne emerged into the Mona Passage and resumed deepening, becoming at Category 1 hurricane at midday on September 16. By early on September 17, Jeanne weakened to a tropical storm due to its slow movement over the rough terrain of Hispaniola, and briefly fell to tropical depression intensity at 18:00 UTC. After re-emerging into the Atlantic, the storm then moved generally northward. After the system passed between the eastern Bahamas and Turks and Caicos Islands on September 18, slow re-intensification occurred.

Late on September 20, Jeanne again became a Category 1 hurricane; around that time, it began to execute an anti-cyclonic loop. The storm moved eastward, before a trough of low pressure caused Jeanne to curve southeastward. Early on September 22, the system strengthened into a Category 2 hurricane. A deep-layer ridge slowly curved Jeanne to the west by the following day, around the time it weakened to a Category 1 hurricane due to upwelled waters. However, the storm began re-intensifying on September 24, becoming a Category 2 hurricane again that day and a Category 3 by September 25. Jeanne made its final landfall on Hutchinson Island, Florida at the same time around 04:00 UTC on September 26. It quickly weakened after moving inland and fell to tropical storm intensity only 14 hours later. Curving northward, Jeanne decayed to a tropical depression over Georgia late on September 27. Jeanne turned northeastward and became extratropical over Virginia after about 24 hours. The remnants briefly re-strengthened after moving offshore the Delmarva Peninsula, but dissipated late on September 29.

In Guadeloupe, rainfall amounts up to  caused flooding and mudslides throughout the island. Many roads and bridges were inundated or washed out. About 470 homes were damaged or destroyed. Similar impact was reported in Puerto Rico, with heavy precipitation causing flooding and mudslides. There was also heavy damage to crops, schools, houses, and businesses. Strong wind gusts left 70% of the island without power. Jeanne resulted in $169.9 million in damage and eight deaths. In Dominican Republic, major flooding was reported, with rivers overflowing, bridges collapsing, roads cut off, damage to agriculture, and mudslides. Strong winds disrupted telephone services and caused power outages. Overall, hundreds of people became homeless and there was 23 deaths and $270 million in damage. Over 200,000 people were left homeless and an estimated 3,006 fatalities occurred. In the Bahamas, communications were disrupted and some homes were inundated by storm surge in the Abaco Islands. Similar impact was reported on Grand Bahama, with several houses and the airport being flooded. Further, winds tore-off and damaged a number of roofs. Throughout the state of Florida, strong winds were observed, leaving approximately 3.44 million people without electricity. Additionally, more than 101,611 homes were impacted by the storm, almost 14,000 of which severely or beyond repairs. Several other states experienced severe flooding. Overall, there were five deaths and about $7.5 billion in damage in the United States.

Hurricane Karl

The depression moved westward under a subtropical ridge and became Tropical Storm Karl later that day. On September 17, the storm curved northwestward and continued strengthening, reaching hurricane status early on September 18. Karl intensified significantly while moving west to west-northwestward and became a major hurricane by early the next day. The storm briefly deepened to a Category 4 hurricane on September 20, before weakening slightly and subsequently re-strengthening to that intensity. With a steadily increasing wind field, Karl peaked with maximum sustained winds of  early on September 21 while resuming a northwestward motion.

After peak intensity on September 21, Karl weakened due to increasing wind shear, while moving northeastward in response to a baroclinic trough. After wind shear lessened, the storm briefly became a major hurricane again on September 23. However, wind shear returned later that day and ocean temperatures began cooling. Another trough re-curved Karl northward on September 24 as the storm was gradually weakening. The remnants of Karl accelerated northeastward and then east-northeastward. The extratropical remnants of Karl dissipated over Norway on September 28.

Hurricane Lisa

Despite unfavorable conditions due to outflow from nearby Hurricane Karl, the depression strengthened into Tropical Storm Lisa on September 20. After nearly reaching hurricane status, Lisa began executing a small cyclonic loop due to a Fujiwhara interaction with a tropical wave. Additionally, the interaction caused Lisa to weaken to a tropical depression on September 23. As Lisa merged with the tropical wave, convection became difficult to distinguish between the two systems, although Lisa maintained a distinct low-level circulation throughout the merger. During the next several days, the storm fluctuated in intensity, from a tropical depression to a strong tropical storm. A deep mid- to upper-level trough caused Lisa to turn northward on September 25.

By October 1, a short-wave trough re-curved and accelerated Lisa toward the northeast. The storm strengthened and was finally upgraded to a hurricane at 06:00 UTC on October 2. The storm lost tropical characteristics and transitioned into an extratropical cyclone at 12:00 UTC on October 3.

Tropical Storm Matthew

The depression strengthened into Tropical Storm Matthew about six hours later. The storm moved generally northeastward or northward throughout its duration. Only an hour later, Matthew weakened to a tropical depression and became extratropical early on October 11.

The storm dropped heavy rainfall in southeastern Louisiana, with a peak total of  near Haynesville. A combination of storm surge and heavy rainfall inundated numerous roads in Lafourche, Orleans, St. Bernard, St. John the Baptist, St. Tammany, and Terrebonne parishes. About 20 homes in Terrebonne Parish were damaged, while several others were flooded in Lafourche Parish. A tornado also damaged the roof of a trailer in Golden Meadow. Winds resulted in electrical outages for approximately 2,500 customers. The storm cracked water lines in LaPlace, leaving nearly 30,000 residents without tap water. Overall, losses in Louisiana reached $255,000. In Mississippi, storm surge caused coastal flooding in Hancock County. Damage in the state totaled only $50,000.

Subtropical Storm Nicole

The interaction between an upper-level trough and a decaying cold front led to the development of a low-pressure area on October 8 to the southwest of Bermuda. Although it lacked a well-defined center of circulation, the system was already producing gale-force winds. Early on October 10, the low developed a curved band of convection northwest of the center, and it organized into Subtropical Storm Nicole by 06:00 UTC. An approaching mid-level trough turned the system northeastward. On the island, Nicole and its precursor dropped  of rainfall and produced wind gusts reaching . The winds left 1,800 homes and businesses without power, while the unsettled conditions caused delays at the L.F. Wade International Airport.

After passing Bermuda, Nicole developed an area of convection near the center, suggesting the beginning of a transition to a tropical cyclone. A larger extratropical storm absorbed Nicole on October 11, while the storm was located south of Nova Scotia. In Maine, gusty winds from the remnants of Nicole downed trees and electrical lines, resulting some power outages, especially along or near the coast. Similarly, 11,300 people were left without electricity in Prince Edward Island and New Brunswick alone after winds uprooted trees and toppled power lines.

Tropical Storm Otto

A cold front and a strong upper-level trough interacted, resulting in the development of an extratropical low-pressure area on November 26. Initially, the storm moved northwestward due to a weakness in a subtropical ridge. Deep convection formed near the center and the storm began transitioning to a warm core system.

The system was re-classified as Tropical Storm Otto at 12:00 UTC on November 30, although it is possible that Otto transitioned to a fully tropical cyclone one day earlier, on November 29. Although sea temperatures were relatively cold, Otto did not quickly weaken, because of low wind shear. On December 1, the storm curved southeastward and completed a cyclonic loop later that day. After wind shear began increasing, Otto started weakening and was downgraded to a tropical depression at 12:00 UTC on December 2. Otto was the first tropical cyclone to form in the month of November since Olga of 2001.

Season effects
The following table lists all of the storms that formed in the 2004 Atlantic hurricane season. It includes their duration, names, intensities, areas affected, damages, and death totals. Deaths in parentheses are additional and indirect (an example of an indirect death would be a traffic accident), but were still related to that storm. Damage and deaths include totals while the storm was extratropical, a wave, or a low, and all of the damage figures are in 2004 USD.

Storm names

The following names were used for named storms that formed in the North Atlantic in 2004. This is the same list used for the 1998 season except for Gaston and Matthew, which replaced Georges and Mitch. The names not retired from this list were used again in 2010. Storms were named Gaston, Matthew, and Otto for the first time in 2004.

Retirement
On April 5, 2005, The World Meteorological Organization retired four names – Charley, Frances, Ivan, and Jeanne due to extreme damages and death toll and will not be used again for an Atlantic hurricane. They were replaced in the 2010 season by Colin, Fiona, Igor, and Julia. The 2004 season is tied with the 1955, 1995, and 2017 seasons for the second-highest number of names retired after a single season in the Atlantic basin, surpassed only by the 2005 season, which had five names retired.

See also

Tropical cyclones in 2004
South-West Indian Ocean cyclone seasons: 2003–04, 2004–05
Australian region cyclone seasons: 2003–04, 2004–05
South Pacific cyclone seasons: 2003–04, 2004–05
2004 South Atlantic hurricane

Notes

References

External links

 Satellite movie of 2004 Atlantic hurricane season
 2004 NHC Tropical Cyclone Advisory Archive
 U.S. Rainfall from Tropical Cyclones in 2004
 Effects of the Third-Quarter Hurricanes on Income Measures

 
Atlantic hurricane seasons
Tropical cyclones in 2004